"Mi Forma de Sentir" ("My Way of Feeling") is a song by La Revolución de Emiliano Zapata and written by the band's front man Javier Martín del Campo from their 1979 album of the same name.

Cover versions

In 1994, Mexican singer Pedro Fernández covered the song on his 1994 album of the same name. His version peaked at #6 on the Hot Latin Songs chart and #10 on the Regional Mexican Airplay chart. A year later, Puerto Rican salsa singer Giro also covered "Mi Forma de Sentir" on his album Loco Corazón (1995). Giro's version reached #1 on the Tropical Airplay chart where it spent two week at the spot. On the 1996 year-end charts, it ranked at #14 on the Tropical Airplay charts.

Charts

Weekly charts

Year-end charts

See also
Billboard Hot Latin Songs Year-End Chart
List of Billboard Tropical Airplay number ones of 1996

References

1979 songs
1994 singles
1995 singles
Pedro Fernández (singer) songs
Sony Discos singles
Giro (singer) songs